Pinjara is an Indian Marathi-language television series which aired on Zee Marathi. It starred Bhushan Pradhan and Sanskruti Balgude in lead roles. The show premiered from 17 January 2011 by replacing Amarprem.

Cast 
 Bhushan Pradhan as Virendra (Veer)
 Sanskruti Balgude as Anandi
 Girish Oak as Macchindra
 Sumukhi Pendse as Akka
 Sunil Tawde as Tatya
 Sara Shravan
 Pournima Manohar
 Shubhangi Latkar
 Namrata Kadam
 Supriya Pathare
 Vijay Patwardhan
 Atul Todankar

Awards

References

External links 
 
 

Marathi-language television shows
Zee Marathi original programming
2011 Indian television series debuts
2012 Indian television series endings